Henry George Callow New (16 July 1920 – 16 June 1994) was an Australian rules footballer who played with Melbourne in the Victorian Football League (VFL).

Prior to playing with Melbourne, New served in the Australian Army during World War II.

After playing two senior games in two years with Melbourne, New switched to Brighton where he played with his brother Thomas New in 1946.

Notes

External links 

Harry New's playing statistics from The VFA Project

1920 births
Australian rules footballers from Melbourne
Melbourne Football Club players
Brighton Football Club players
1994 deaths
Australian Army personnel of World War II
People from St Kilda, Victoria
Military personnel from Melbourne